The overseer of the treasuries (alternative translation: overseer of the two treasuries; imy-r prwy ḥḏ) was an important official at the ancient Egyptian court of the Old and the New Kingdom. The title is first attested in the Fourth Dynasty. The title is not common in the Middle Kingdom, but is in the New Kingdom one of the most important ones at the royal court. The treasury was the place in the royal palace where precious materials were stored, such as metal objects, but also linen. Therefore, the overseer of the treasuries was basically responsible for administrating the resources of the country. The title is also attested in the Late Period. The writing of the title varies between ""overseer of the treasury" (imy-r pr ḥḏ) and "overseer of the two treasuries" (imy-r prwy ḥḏ). It is not always clear whether this relates to different functions.

References 

Ancient Egyptian titles
Overseer of the treasury